Manoba izuensis is a moth in the family Nolidae. It was described by Hiroshi Inoue in 1961. It is found in Japan.

References

Moths described in 1961
Nolinae